Trigonoptera vittata is a species of beetle in the family Cerambycidae. It was described by Gestro in 1876. It is known from Australia.

References

Tmesisternini
Beetles described in 1876